Megachile esseniensis is a species of bee in the family Megachilidae. It was described by Pasteels in 1979.

References

Esseniensis
Insects described in 1979